The black-capped hemispingus (Kleinothraupis atropileus) is a species of bird in the family Thraupidae. It is found in the Andes mountains of Colombia, Ecuador, and Venezuela. Its natural habitat is subtropical or tropical moist montane forests.

Description
The species has a yellow breast and underparts, while its back and tail are green.

Habitat
They feed on Chusquea bamboo species.

References

black-capped hemispingus
Birds of the Colombian Andes
Birds of the Ecuadorian Andes
black-capped hemispingus
Taxonomy articles created by Polbot